Jagdgeschwader 20 (JG 20) was a Luftwaffe fighter wing during the early phase of World War II in Europe. JG 20 was founded on 15 July 1939 in Döberitz, composed of one Gruppe and two Staffeln. A third Staffel was added on 5 November 1939 in Brandenburg-Briest. The sole Gruppe was redesignated as 3rd Gruppe of Jagdgeschwader 51 (III./JG 51) on 4 July 1940. During the Battle of France it was subordinated to Luftflotte 2. The unit's commanders included Hauptmann Hannes Trautloft, from 19 September 1939 to 4 July 1940.

References

Bibliography

Jagdgeschwader 020
Military units and formations established in 1939
Military units and formations disestablished in 1940